The women's team table tennis event was part of the table tennis programme and took place between September 27 and September 30, at the Suwon Gymnasium.

Schedule
All times are Korea Standard Time (UTC+09:00)

Results

Preliminary round

Group A

Group B

Group C

Group D

Knockout round

Quarterfinals

Semifinals

Final

Non-participating athletes

References

 incheon2014ag.org

External links
Official website

Table tennis at the 2014 Asian Games